Brookville is an unincorporated community in Milton, Ontario, Canada.

History
The settlement was originally called "Nassagaweya".  It was located within Nassagaweya Township.

In 1831, Elias Easterbrook and his wife Hannah Youart settled in Nassagaweya and built a large house.  Their son, Thomas Easterbrook, became the first reeve and treasurer of the township, and the settlement of Nassagaweya was renamed "Easterbrook" in his honour.  It was later renamed "Brookville", which still used part of Easterbrook's name.

The Nassagiweya post office operated from 1840 to 1914, and Thomas Easterbrook was postmaster from 1844 to 1868.

In 1852, Thomas Easterbrook built a store which was also used as a post office.  That same year he erected a hotel and wheat storehouse, though the hotel burned shortly after being built.

Around 1865, the Easterbook's stone house was used as a hotel.  The early settlement also had tailor, harness shop, cooper, dentist, and veterinarian.

A town hall was built in 1875, incorporating part of the original house of Elias Easterbrook and Hannah Youart.  Construction was partly funded by the Sons of Temperance.  Dances and parties were held once or twice a month at the Brookville Hall, and it was the centre of the community’s social activity. The town hall was moved and reconstructed in 1987.

The Nassagaweya Fall Show took place annually in Brookville.  The Acton Free Press wrote in 1884:
A large number of sturdy yeoman in Nassagaweya with their wives and families might be seen driving into the little place known as Brookville from early in the morning.  Their wagons were generally well loaded with farm or dairy produce of excellent quality, to be entered for competition in their own and only fall show.

In 1900, fire destroyed four buildings in Brookville, sparing the general store and town hall.

The park includes a play area, multi-use court, playground with covered shelter, paved and lit trails, and a batting/pitching cage.

In 2000, a housing project, Churchhill Estates, began construction in Brookville.

References

Neighbourhoods in Milton, Ontario